Edmond Roudnitska (born 26 June 1931) is a French hurdler. He competed in the 110 metres hurdles at the 1952, 1956 and the 1960 Summer Olympics.

References

External links
 

1931 births
Possibly living people
Athletes (track and field) at the 1952 Summer Olympics
Athletes (track and field) at the 1956 Summer Olympics
Athletes (track and field) at the 1960 Summer Olympics
French male hurdlers
Olympic athletes of France
Place of birth missing (living people)
20th-century French people
21st-century French people